Angelita can be:

 Angelita Lind, a Puerto Rican track and field athlete
 Angelita Detudamo, a Nauruan tennis player
 Angelita Trujillo, Dominican author and daughter of dictator Rafael Trujillo
 USCGC Sea Cloud (WPG-284), weather ship for the United States Coast Guard, renamed Angelita in honor for Angelita Trujillo